Hentziectypus conjunctus is a species of comb-footed spider in the family Theridiidae. It is found in the USA and Canada.

References

Theridiidae
Spiders described in 1936
Spiders of North America